Sir Benjamin Hingley, 1st Baronet,  (11 September 1830 – 13 May 1905) was an English ironmaster and Liberal politician who sat in the House of Commons from 1885 to 1895.

Life
Hingley was born at Cradley, Worcestershire, the son of Noah Hingley and his first wife Sarah Willett. He was educated at Halesowen Grammar School. He entered the family firms of Noah Hingley and Sons chain and anchor manufacturers and Hingley and Smith colliery proprietors. Hingley and Company had Iron Works at Netherton and Old Hill which were supplied with coal from two small mines at Dudley Wood and Primrose Hill. In 1865 on the death of his brother Hezekiah, he became head of the firms. He was Chairman of the South Staffordshire and East Worcestershire Ironmasters Association. 
He was also president of the Midland Iron and Steel Wages Board and of the South Staffordshire Coal Trade Wages Board.
 
Hingley was elected as the Member of Parliament (MP) for North Worcestershire at the 1885 general election. He became a Liberal Unionist in 1886 but reverted to the Liberals in 1892, and held the seat until the 1895 general election when he retired through ill-health. 
He was also an alderman of Dudley and Mayor of Dudley from 1887 to 1889 and county alderman for Staffordshire from 1889 to 1892. He was created a baronet on 8 August 1893. Hingley was also a J.P. for Dudley, Worcestershire and Staffordshire. 
He became High Sheriff of Worcestershire in 1900, and a deputy lieutenant of the county that summer. 
In 1903, he was elected president of the Mining Association of Great Britain.

Hingley lived at Hatherton Lodge, Cradley, where he died on 13 May 1905, and was buried at Halesowen Church Yard. He was succeeded in the baronetcy by his nephew, George Benjamin Hingley. A blue plaque on the site of Hatherton Lodge commemorates Noah and Benjamin.

Hingley laid the foundation stone for the Methodist Church  in Birmingham Street, which has since been converted to a bar and restaurant called "Benjamin's".

Notes

References

External links 
 

   

1830 births
1905 deaths
Liberal Party (UK) MPs for English constituencies
UK MPs 1885–1886
UK MPs 1886–1892
UK MPs 1892–1895
Baronets in the Baronetage of the United Kingdom
People from Cradley, West Midlands
High Sheriffs of Worcestershire
Members of Staffordshire County Council
Politics of Dudley
Mayors of places in the West Midlands (county)
Deputy Lieutenants of Worcestershire
Liberal Unionist Party MPs for English constituencies